Abdul Qayoom Mollah is a Major General of Bangladesh Army and General Officer Commanding (GOC) of 7th infantry Division & Area Commandar of Barishal. Earlier, he served as the Commandant of Bangladesh Institute of Peace Support Operations Training.

Career 
Brigadier General Mollah commanded the 360 Infantry Brigade based in Jalalabad Cantonment in 2016. From 16 December 2015 to 07 September 2016 he served as the station commander of Jalalabad  Cantonment.

In December 2020, Mollah was appointed the  Controller of Examinations of the Secondary and Higher Education Department of the Bangladesh University of Professionals.

Mollah hosted General Manoj Mukund Naravane, Chief of Staff of the Indian Army, during his visit to the Bangladesh Institute of Peace Support Operations Training in April 2021.

On 24 November 2021, Mollah attended a defence conference of the Bangladesh High Commission in the United Kingdom.

References 

Living people
Bangladesh Army generals
Year of birth missing (living people)